Li Huzhao (born January 18, 1989) is a Paralympian athlete from China competing mainly in category T53 sprint events.

He competed in the 2008 Summer Paralympics in Beijing, China.  There he won a gold medal in the men's 4 x 100 metre relay – T53-54 event, a gold medal in the men's 4 x 400 metre relay – T53-54 event, a gold medal in the men's 800 metres – T53 event and a silver medal in the men's 400 metres – T53 event. His teammates in the relays were Cui Yanfeng, Zhang Lixin, Zong Kai, and Zhao Ji.

References 
 

1989 births
Paralympic athletes of China
Athletes (track and field) at the 2008 Summer Paralympics
Paralympic gold medalists for China
Paralympic silver medalists for China
Living people
Sportspeople from Shijiazhuang
Medalists at the 2008 Summer Paralympics
Medalists at the 2012 Summer Paralympics
Medalists at the 2016 Summer Paralympics
Athletes (track and field) at the 2012 Summer Paralympics
Athletes (track and field) at the 2016 Summer Paralympics
Chinese male wheelchair racers
Paralympic medalists in athletics (track and field)
21st-century Chinese people
Medalists at the 2010 Asian Para Games
Medalists at the 2014 Asian Para Games